Hatipköy can refer to:

 Hatipköy, Edirne
 Hatipköy, Kastamonu